Nathaniel Isaacs (1808–1872) was an English adventurer who played a part in the history of Natal, South Africa. He wrote a memoir spread over two volumes (whose accuracy is now disputed) called Travels and Adventures in Eastern Africa (1836). This book subsequently became one of the principal sources quoted by writers of the history of Natal, including Morris (The Washing of the Spears: The Rise and Fall of the Zulu Nation),
Ritter (Shaka Zulu: The Rise of the Zulu Empire) and Bulpin (Natal and the Zulu Country).

Early life 
Isaacs was born in Canterbury, England, into a Jewish family. His father was a merchant and resident of Chatham and his mother was Lenie Solomon, daughter of Nathaniel Solomon of Margate and Phoebe Mitz who came from the Netherlands. After his father died in 1822, he joined his maternal uncle, Saul Solomon Sr., a merchant based on the island of St. Helena. His cousin, Saul Solomon Jr., was an influential liberal politician of the Cape Colony. In June 1825 he persuaded his uncle to allow him to accompany Lieutenant King, captain of the brig The Mary to South Africa in the capacity of the captain's "companion". After the brig had discharged its cargoes in Cape Town, King sailed for Port Natal to search for the adventurers Francis Farewell, an East India merchant, and Francis Fynn, a physician, from whom nothing had been heard for eighteen months.

Stranded in Natal 
Leaving Cape Town on 26 August 1825, The Mary the party made several stops along the Southern African coast, anchoring off Port Natal on 1 October. On entry to the port, The Mary foundered when she struck a sandbank.

On reaching shore, the party found Farewell's camp, but Farewell and his party were on a hunting expedition. Once Farewell returned, Isaacs accompanied King on a courtesy visit to Dingane, brother of the Zulu king Shaka. Once Shaka heard of King's arrival, King and his entire party were summoned to his kraal.

Isaacs records his impressions of the Zulu people and their customs which are particularly interesting as they are an account of the Zulu people before they came under European influence. He lived in daily contact with the powerful King Shaka of the Zulus, at the time the Zulu Empire was at its peak influence in Southern Africa. He was treated on the whole with favour, having rank and honours conferred upon him, as well as a large tract of land. 
Most of what has been written about Shaka comes from the accounts of Henry Francis Fynn and Isaacs who learned to speak the Zulu language fluently.

Lt Farewell, Fynn and Isaacs established the town of Port Natal, later renamed Durban, which became the second largest city in South Africa in modern times. In 1828 King Shaka made Isaacs "Induna Incoola", or Principal Chief of Natal, and granted him great areas of land.

Subsequent career 
Isaacs left Natal in 1831, when Shaka's successor Dingane had prepared to massacre the few whites living there;

In 1844 Isaacs abandoned his claim on the land granted him by Shaka and settled in Sierra Leone where he built up a thriving business. However, in 1854 he was accused of slave-trading by the governor, Sir Arthur Kennedy. Isaacs got wind of his impending arrest and left for Liverpool where he was to spend the last years of his life. Kennedy was appointed Governor of New South Wales and took the papers relating to the slave-trading charges with him when returning to England before taking up his post in Australia. The papers were lost when the ship in which he was travelling, the Forerunner was wrecked off Madeira in October 1854. In the absence of the papers, the English courts refused to proceed with the prosecution.

Isaacs died on 26 Jun 1872 in Egremont, on the opposite side of the Mersey from Liverpool and is buried in the Canterbury Jewish Cemetery.

Historians' commentary 
In recent years many academics have questioned the accuracy of Isaac's writings. Dan Wylie, an academic at Rhodes University has asserted that Isaacs deliberately exaggerated the extent of Shaka's brutality to boost the sales of his and of Flynn's books. Other historians though were quick to challenge Wylie. Petros Sibani, a historian and tour guide of Zulu battlefields, said there was no doubting Shaka "was a cruel and ruthless man but they were cruel and ruthless times".

Another historian, Stephen Gray, also questioned the accuracy of Isaacs's writings. In his commentary on the writings of Charles Rawden Maclean in The Nautical Magazine, he notes that Maclean made no mention of Isaacs at all. He also conjectures that it was Isaacs who gave Maclean the name "John Ross" because he could not remember Maclean's real name. Gray is scathing of Isaacs to the extent that when comparing the writings of the two men he wrote "The differences between Maclean's and Isaacs' accounts [of Shaka's brutality] are so glaring that one is forced to ask which of the two is plain lying."

Published works

References

Further reading

1808 births
1872 deaths
19th-century English Jews
19th-century English memoirists
English emigrants to South Africa
English explorers
English people of Dutch-Jewish descent
Explorers of Africa
History of KwaZulu-Natal
Jewish explorers
People from Canterbury
Settlers of South Africa
South African explorers